Andrea Herczeg (born 13 September 1994) is a Romanian footballer who plays as a midfielder for Szent Mihály FC and the Romania women's national team.

Career
Herczeg has been capped for the Romania national team, appearing for the team during the 2019 FIFA Women's World Cup qualifying cycle.

International goals

References

External links
 
 
 

1994 births
Living people
Romanian women's footballers
Romania women's international footballers
Women's association football midfielders
Romanian sportspeople of Hungarian descent
Romanian expatriate footballers
Romanian expatriate sportspeople in Sweden
Expatriate women's footballers in Sweden